Urlați is a town in Prahova County, Muntenia, Romania. In 2011, it had a population of 10,064. Sixteen villages are administered by the town: Arioneștii Noi, Arioneștii Vechi, Cherba, Jercălăi, Mărunțiș, Orzoaia de Jos, Orzoaia de Sus, Schiau, Ulmi, Valea Bobului, Valea Crângului, Valea Mieilor, Valea Nucetului, Valea Pietrei, Valea Seman and Valea Urloii.

The town is located in the south-central part of the county. It borders the following communes: Ceptura to the northeast,  Tomșani to the southeast, Albești Paleologu to the south, Valea Călugărească to the southwest, Plopu to the west, and Iordăcheanu to the north.

The river Cricovul Sărat flows through Urlați.

Natives
 Octavian Grigore
 Constantin Vișoianu

Climate
Urlați has a humid subtropical climate (Cfa in the Köppen climate classification).

References

Towns in Romania
Populated places in Prahova County
Localities in Muntenia
Monotowns in Romania